The 2018–19 Ukrainian First League U–19 Championship is the 3rd season of the Ukrainian Junior Under 19 Championship in First League. The competition involved participation of several junior teams of the Professional Football League of Ukraine as well as some other football academies.

Direct administration of the competition belonged to the Youth Football League of Ukraine. The tournament was conducted in cooperation between both Youth Football League and Professional Football League.

Teams
 Debut: Adrenalin Lutsk, Dynamo Lviv, Temp Vinnytsia, Zmina-Obolon Kyiv, KDYuSSh Chempion, imeni Lva Yashina, VO DYuSSh Vinnytsia, Petrykivka, Dnipro Cherkasy, Kremin Kremenchuk, Kobra Kharkiv, Holkiper Zaporizhia, Metalurh Kamianske, Avanhard Kramatorsk, Kvadro Pervomaiskyi, UOR imeni Serhia Bubky, Arena Kharkiv, Dnipro-1-Borysfen
 Withdrawn: Volyn Lutsk, Opir Lviv, DYuSSh Ternopil, DYuSSh Berezhany, Chaika Vyshhorod, Cherkaskyi Dnipro, Heolis Kharkiv, Olimpik Kharkiv

Group stage

Group 1

Top goalscorers

Group 2

Top goalscorers

Group 3

Top goalscorers

Group 4

Top goalscorers

Finals

Quarterfinals

Four teams tournament

Semifinals 
in Uman, Cherkasy Oblast

Game for 3rd place

Finals 

Notes

See also
2018–19 Ukrainian First League
2018–19 Ukrainian Second League

References

External links
 Season's results  at the Youth Football League of Ukraine
 Gold Talant, general information on all youth competitions in Ukraine
 Athletic Club Odessa. official website
 FC Lyubomir. official website
 UFC Olimpik Kharkiv. official website

First League
Junior Championship First League